Fabiola María Morales Castillo (born 26 September 1955) is a Peruvian politician and a Congresswoman representing Piura for the 2006–2011 term. Morales was elected under the National Unity belongs to the National Solidarity party. She lost her seat in the 2011 elections when she ran for re-election, but she received a minority of votes.

Controversies 
She has been known for her constant activity as a "troll" in order to attack former mayor of Lima, Susana Villaran, from which she has received more criticism than praise. She also gained a negative public image due to major corruption scandals, as well as homophobic comments and discrimination against the handicapped.

References

External links

Official Congressional Site

University of Piura alumni
Living people
National Unity (Peru) politicians
National Solidarity Party (Peru) politicians
Popular Renewal politicians
Members of the Congress of the Republic of Peru
1955 births